No. 227 Radar Station RAAF  was a Royal Australian Air Force radar station located at Yanchep, Western Australia. Established during World War II to provide early warning of Japanese air raids against Perth, the radar station was formed in 1942–43 and operational by late 1943.

History
In 1942, approval was granted for the establishment of radar equipment at Yanchep. The site became fully operational on 27 October 1943. No. 227 Radar Station was formed in August 1943 and was responsible for the operation of the radar, and reporting to the Western Australian Air Defence Headquarters. The unit was a combination of Royal Australian Air Force (RAAF) and Women's Auxiliary Australian Air Force (WAAAF) personnel.

Two concrete huts, 40 metres apart, housed the radar equipment. The southern hut contained the transmitter and the northern hut the receiver. The daily unit operational occurrence reports do not record any actual tracking of enemy aircraft although the unit had the distinction of being responsible for the first genuine air raid alarm for the city of Perth. This occurred during that Western Australian emergency of March 1944. Authorities decided that they could not wait any longer for positive confirmation of enemy activity and a full scale air raid alarm was sounded throughout the city of Perth. No aircraft were spotted, and a later investigation suggested it had been the result of enemy jamming.

After Victory in the Pacific Day, 15 August 1945, personnel were progressively ordered out. Operations ceased in November 1945,  and the unit was finally disbanded after two years and one months service. The station's former bunkers were turned to agricultural production by local mushroom growers in the 1960s and 70s, but eventually became disused. In 1987–88, they were classified in the Register of the National Estate and classified by the National Trust of Australia.

References

Further reading

External links
 VHF/DF and Radar Sites in Australia during World War II

RAAF radar and surveillance units
Western Australian places listed on the defunct Register of the National Estate
State Register of Heritage Places in the City of Wanneroo